Eda Ece Uzunalioğlu (born 20 June 1990) is an award winning Turkish actress best known for her portrayal of Yıldız Yılmaz  in the Turkish drama series Yasak Elma.

Life and career 
Eda attended Şişli Terakki High School and graduated with a degree in psychology from Istanbul Bilgi University. She's the youngest of three daughters in her family.

She stated that she will be a screenwriter and producer.

Series career
After appearing in a minor role in 2002 as child actor, she was cast with supporting roles in hit youth series "Hayat Bilgisi", fantasy child series "Bez Bebek", "Adını Feriha Koydum", "Mihriban", "Aşkın Mucizeleri" until 2011.

She got her first leading role in youth series Pis Yedili which more 100 episodes.

She then joined the cast of popular youth series Beni Böyle Sev and portrayed the character of 
Zeyno. In 2015, She had a leading role in romantic comedy series İlişki Durumu: Karışık with Berk Oktay.

She started portraying the character of Yıldız in the TV series Yasak Elma which more 100 episodes.

Film career
In 2013, she had her first cinematic lead role experience with Kızım İçin. She was cast in the comedy films Kocan Kadar Konuş and "Kocan Kadar Konuş: Diriliş". She played in the Gupse Özay's comedy movies Görümce and "Deliha 2". In the same year, she appeared in a leading role in Mahrumlar TV film. After getting a part in film Dede Korkut Hikayeleri: Deli Dumrul, written by Burak Aksak famous writer of hit surreal comedy Leyla ile Mecnun. The film is not original story of Book of Dede Korkut, but a parody.

Filmography

Film

Television

Programming

References

External links 
 

Living people
1990 births
Actresses from Istanbul
Turkish television actresses
Turkish film actresses
Turkish child actresses
Istanbul Bilgi University alumni